Oregon Township is one of twelve townships in Clark County, Indiana. As of the 2010 census, its population was 1,769 and it contained 692 housing units.

History
Oregon Township was organized in 1852. Oregon Township was purportedly so named because at the time of the township's organization, it was sparsely inhabited and considered as remote as the Oregon Territory.

Geography

Unincorporated towns
 Marysville
 New Market
(This list is based on USGS data and may include former settlements.)

Adjacent townships
 Lexington Township, Scott County (north)
 Washington Township (east)
 Owen Township (southeast)
 Charlestown Township (south)
 Monroe Township (west)
 Vienna Township, Scott County (northwest)

Major highways
  Indiana State Road 3
  Indiana State Road 203
  Indiana State Road 362

Cemeteries
The township contains several cemeteries: Beswick (aka Walnut Hill), Covert, Emmanuel United Methodist Church, Goben, Hebron, Kern, Otisco, New Market Christian Church, New Market Presbyterian Church (aka Mt. Vernon), Sawmill Road, States, and Webb Farm.

References
 United States Census Bureau cartographic boundary files
 U.S. Board on Geographic Names

External links

 Indiana Township Association
 United Township Association of Indiana

Townships in Clark County, Indiana
Townships in Indiana
Populated places established in 1852
1852 establishments in Indiana